Jinggu Dai and Yi Autonomous County is an autonomous county under the jurisdiction of Pu'er City, Yunnan Province, China.

Administrative divisions
In the present, Jinggu Dai and Yi Autonomous County has 6 towns and 4 townships.
6 towns

4 townships

Ethnic groups
The Jinggu County Gazetteer (1993:682) lists the following ethnic groups and their locations.

Hani (pop. 2,440)
Fengshan Township 凤山乡: Wenzhe 文折村 and Wenshao 文绍村 villages (total pop. 1,562)
Bi'an Township 碧安乡
Hui (pop. 1,711)
Weiyuan 威远, Yongping 永平, Bi'an 碧安 townships
Bulang (pop. 1,532)
Manghai Village 芒海村, Mengban Township 勐班乡
Guangmin Village 光明村, Bi'an Township 碧安乡
Zhongshan 钟山, Lemin 民乐, Bianjiang 边江, Banpo 半坡 townships
Bai (pop. 1,153)
Bi'an 碧安, Zhengxing 正兴, Bianjiang 边江 townships

Yi subgroups in Jinggu are:
Lalu 腊鲁 (Xiangtang 香堂)
Lami 腊米 (Mili 米俐)
Gaisu 改苏 (Luoluo 倮倮)
Laluo 腊罗 (Menghua 蒙化)
Sani 撒尼
Awu 阿武

2014 earthquake

On October 7, 2014 a magnitude 6.6 earthquake struck the Jinggu county at 9:49 p.m. local time.  The earthquake was felt in many parts of Yunnan including the provincial capital, Kunming, nearly 300 miles away.

Climate

References

External links
Jinggu County Official Site

County-level divisions of Pu'er City
Dai autonomous counties
Yi autonomous counties